Brady House may refer to:

People
 Brady House (baseball) (born 2003), American baseball player

Structures
The Brady house, fictional home of the TV series The Brady Bunch, and subject of the TV series A Very Brady Renovation
Brady Cabin, Ardmore, Oklahoma, listed on the National Register of Historic Places (NRHP)
Brady-Brady House, Sandy, Utah, NRHP-listed
Halloran-Matthews-Brady House, Spearfish, South Dakota, NRHP-listed

See also
Brady Building-Empire Theater, San Antonio, Texas, NRHP-listed
McCord-Brady Company, Cheyenne, Wyoming, NRHP-listed
Brady Heights Historic District, Tulsa, Oklahoma, NRHP-listed
Brady Historic District, Tulsa, Oklahoma, NRHP-listed
Brady Memorial Chapel, Pocatello, Idaho, NRHP-listed
Brady Street Historic District, Attica, Indiana, NRHP-listed
Brady (disambiguation)